The Docklands Light Railway extension to Thamesmead is a proposed Docklands Light Railway (DLR) extension to serve the Beckton Riverside and Thamesmead redevelopment areas of East London.

Mooted in the late 2010s, the extension was first formally proposed by Transport for London (TfL) as part of the Thamesmead and Abbey Wood Opportunity Area Planning Framework (OAPF), with proposed stations at 'Beckton Riverside' and 'Thamesmead Central'.

Project development

Background 
Thamesmead, built on former marshland on the south bank of the River Thames in East London, was developed by the Greater London Council from the 1960s onwards to meet the demand from Londoners for social housing. As part of the initial development of the area in the 1970s, the area was intended to be served by the (then) Fleet line and an infill railway station at Church Manor Way. However, plans for the railway station never came to fruition, and the Jubilee line was only extended to Stratford in 1999, with passive provision at North Greenwich for a second branch which would have a route to Thamesmead via the former North London line to North Woolwich, which itself is now used by Crossrail. As a result of these developments, Thamesmead remains as being not directly served by railway services of any kind, with the closest stations being Plumstead, Abbey Wood and Belvedere. Furthermore, the area is in the centre of a  gap in major road crossings of the River Thames – with planned road crossings at nearby Gallions Reach and Belvedere never built.

Limited passive provision is present in the Docklands Light Railway extension to Woolwich Arsenal for a junction to Thamesmead as of 2005, however following the cancellation of the Docklands Light Railway extension to Dagenham Dock and the Thames Gateway Bridge in 2008, TfL considered other ways to assist with the development of the Beckton Riverside and Thamesmead areas throughout the 2010s. Options proposed included:

 new downstream river crossings such as the Silvertown Tunnel, Gallions Reach Crossing and Belvedere Crossing
 an extension of Crossrail east of Abbey Wood
 dedicated high frequency bus services - similar to the Greenwich Waterfront Transit proposal cancelled in 2009
 an extension of the Gospel Oak to Barking line south from Barking Riverside
 an extension of the DLR east from Beckton.

Following the approval of the Silvertown Tunnel in 2018, local campaigners pushed for public transport improvements in the area. Plans for development in Thamesmead continued, with Peabody and Lendlease announcing an £8bn regeneration project in 2019 with over 11,500 new homes to be built. Developers on the south side of the river also pushed for development, with Aberdeen Standard Investments proposing the redevelopment of Gallions Reach Shopping Park.

Formal proposal 
In December 2019, a DLR extension to Thamesmead was formally proposed by TfL as part of the draft Thamesmead and Abbey Wood OAPF, with proposed stations at Armada Riverside in Beckton and Thamesmead. An extension of the DLR was proposed instead of an extension of the Overground from Barking Riverside, as an Overground extension would have lower connectivity benefits, cost more to operate, have a low frequency of trains (4 per hour) and a construction cost twice as much as a DLR extension as the gradients required to cross the River Thames would require large scale tunnelling works when compared to the DLR.

In September 2020, the extension was included in the long term funding submission by TfL to HM Government. The document noted that the extension would cost around £800m, with completion between 2026 and 2030. Following adoption of the OAPF in late 2020, further feasibility and technical work began, funded wholly by landowners and local boroughs. In 2022, the extension was included in the draft London Borough of Newham Local Plan, which proposed "a new city district" at Beckton Riverside, connected by the extension.

Route and stations 
, the proposed route of DLR extension diverges from the Beckton branch just after Gallions Reach, turning east to pass by Beckton DLR depot before Beckton Riverside station in Beckton. The route then continues southeast, crossing the river before arriving at a planned Thamesmead Central. The OAPF consultation also noted that the line could be extended in the future to Belvedere, Abbey Wood or elsewhere in Bexley in the future, via two other stations.

References

Proposed railway stations in England
Docklands Light Railway
Transport for London
Proposed railway lines in London
Transport in the Royal Borough of Greenwich
Transport in the London Borough of Newham